Mount King may refer to:

 Mount King (Antarctica), a mountain in the Tula Mountains
 Mount King (British Columbia), a summit in the Canadian Rockies 
 King Peak (Yukon), also called Mount King, a mountain in Canada
 Parish of Mount King, a civil parish of Poole County, New South Wales, Australia

See also
 Mount King Albert, in Alberta and British Columbia, Canada
 Mount King Edward, in Alberta and British Columbia, Canada
 Mount King George, in Yukon Territory, Canada
 Mount King George (British Columbia), in British Columbia, Canada
 Mount King William, in Tasmania, Australia
 King Peak (disambiguation)
 Kings Peak (disambiguation)